Pseudochromis coccinicauda, the yellow-breasted dottyback, is a species of ray-finned fish, in the family Pseudochromidae, the dottybacks. It is found in the Western Indian Ocean, in the seas around the Maldives, the Andaman Islands and Indonesia. It occasionally makes its way into the aquarium trade.

See also
 List of marine aquarium fish species

References

coccinicauda
Fish described in 1888